The Calgary Event Centre was a planned arena complex to be built in Calgary, Alberta, Canada. It would have replaced the Scotiabank Saddledome, home of the Calgary Flames of the National Hockey League. Construction was scheduled to start in early 2022. It was expected to have a capacity of 18,377. Due to disagreements with the city on additional costs, CSEC pulled out of the project on December 22, 2021.

History

CalgaryNEXT
The Calgary Event Centre project replaces a 2015 plan called CalgaryNEXT, which would have replaced both the Scotiabank Saddledome and McMahon Stadium for Calgary's professional hockey and Canadian football teams. That proposal included two buildings: a 19,000–20,000 seat events centre to serve as the new home arena of two hockey clubs, the National Hockey League's Calgary Flames, and the Calgary Hitmen of the Western Hockey League, as well as the Calgary Roughnecks lacrosse team; and a 40,000-seat football stadium and fieldhouse for the Canadian Football League's Calgary Stampeders and serve as a public training and activity space. The complex, originally planned to be located in the West Village along the Bow River for the "hub of pro and amateur sporting activity."

Immediate reaction to the CalgaryNEXT proposal from local politicians was mixed; they supported the plan to redevelop the West Village area, but many – including Mayor Naheed Nenshi – expressed concern at the proposal, which would potentially have the city initially fund between $440 and $690 million of the projected cost which promoters claim will be recouped over a long period of time. As part of the proposal, the facilities would be owned by the city and managed by the privately owned Calgary Sports and Entertainment Corporation (CSEC) - thus exempting the land from property taxes - but with the city not receiving any share of the profits.

Originally projected as costing $890 million, based on a City of Calgary report released April 2016 it was estimated that CalgaryNEXT would cost about $1.8 billion, with taxpayers paying up to two-thirds of the total.

In April 2017, the Calgary city council voted unanimously to instead support a "plan B" near the Saddledome.

New proposal
On September 12, 2017, Flames president and chief executive officer Ken King stated that the team was no longer pursuing the CalgaryNEXT arena, as "we've been working for a long time trying to come up with a formula that really works to replace this building and we really put our best foot forward and I’ve come to the conclusion sadly and I’m very disappointed that I don't think we can make a deal that works for us". Mayor Nenshi subsequently proposed a partnership wherein portions of the cost of "plan B" would be covered by the city, and the rest covered by the team ownership and user surcharges. King objected to this proposal.

On July 30, 2019, the Calgary city council approved a $550 million new Event Centre. The new arena was to be located to the north of the Saddledome in the Victoria Park neighbourhood. Construction on the building would have begun in 2021, and have a capacity of around 19,000. Plans for the Event Centre also included the possibility of a smaller arena to replace the Stampede Corral. The city of Calgary would have owned the Event Centre while CSEC would have been responsible for the facility's operation and maintenance, keeping all revenue under a 35-year lease agreement, which included a non-relocation clause for the Flames during that period. Had the project went through, The Saddledome would have been demolished after the new arena opened.

On April 14, 2021, the deal for the new arena was put on hold by Calgary city council over budget concerns.

On July 26, 2021, the city announced the cost of the arena had gone from $550 million to $608.5 million. The arena was planned on an inverted bowl design which may not have worked on that particular piece of land and would have been bad for accessibility. As the engineers got further into design work, they realized there were some other potential problems. To address cost overruns, both the City of Calgary and Calgary Sports and Entertainment Corporation would each be putting forward an additional $12.5 million. The clause was part of the original deal signed in 2019. The Calgary Sports and Entertainment Corporation agreed to cover any more cost overruns. The city also announced as part of the new deal between the city and Calgary Sports and Entertainment Corporation, the Calgary Municipal Land Corp. would be removed as project manager and replaced with an organization of CSEC's choosing.

On December 22, 2021, Calgary Sports and Entertainment pulled out of the deal, citing disagreements in significant infrastructure costs ($15 million) and climate mitigation costs ($4 million); costs not previously identified as project costs by CMLC or the City nor included in the $608.5 million target budget in July 2021. Despite this, CSEC intends on staying in the Saddledome.

References

Calgary Flames
Proposed indoor arenas in Canada
Sports venues in Calgary
Western Hockey League arenas
Indoor arenas in Alberta
Indoor ice hockey venues in Canada
Indoor lacrosse venues in Canada
Calgary Roughnecks
Music venues in Calgary